Young Ahmed is a 2019 Belgian drama film directed by Jean-Pierre and Luc Dardenne. The film revolves around a young Muslim boy from Belgium who plots to murder his teacher in the name of his religion. It was selected to compete for the Palme d'Or at the 2019 Cannes Film Festival. At Cannes the Dardenne brothers won the award for Best Director.

Plot
Ahmed, a 13-year-old, plots to kill his teacher, whom he believes to be an apostate after being radicalised by a local imam. Ahmed is arrested and sent to juvenile detention, where he claims to be a reformed character.

Cast
 Idir Ben Addi as Ahmed
 Olivier Bonnaud as Caseworker
 Myriem Akheddiou as Inès
 Victoria Bluck as Louise
 Claire Bodson as Mother
 Othmane Moumen as Imam Youssouf

Reception
The site's critical consensus reads, "Young Ahmed doesn't represent the Dardennes brothers' most developed work, but solid acting and a socially conscious story help compensate for its flaws." Metacritic, which uses a weighted average, assigned the film a score of 66 out of 100, based on 21 critics, indicating "generally favorable reviews".

Accolades

References

External links

2019 films
2019 drama films
2010s French-language films
Belgian drama films
Films directed by the Dardenne brothers
French-language Belgian films